The Empire in Africa, is a 2006 French documentary film directed and produced by Philippe Diaz.

The Filming was completed in 2002 with a terrible end due to another film shot at the same time. The film received mixed reviews from critics and screened at several international film festivals.

Plot
The film deals with tragedy of the 11-year civil war in Sierra Leone. The film has used natural brutal events and tragedies along with the narratives and other international discussions as well as footage from the Sierra Leone, United Nations, and European community. The film also described the life of Sierra Leone and its people eleven years later, where about 70 000 men, women and children had been killed during the civil war. The civil war in Sierra Leone is also described as one of 20th century's most brutal conflicts, and one of the UN's most inglorious humanitarian failures.

Cast
 Ahmad Tejan Kabbah – President of Sierra Leone
 Foday Sankoh – Leader of the Revolutionary United Front
 Mike Lamin – Revolutionary United Front commander
 Zainab Hawa Bangura – Representative of civil society
 Hassan Hujazi – Rice importer
 Joseph Melrose – United States Ambassador to Sierra Leone
 Steve Crossman – United Kingdom Acting Ambassador
 James Jonah – Minister of Finances - Sierra Leone Ambassador to the UN
 Michael Fletcher – Honorary French Consul
 Julius Spencer – Minister of Information
 Hinga Norman – Minister of Defense
 Pascal Lefort – Action Against Hunger
 Pascal Lefort – Action Against Hunger
 S.Y.B. Rogers – Revolutionary United Front spokesperson
 M.A. Carol – President of the Chamber of Commerce
 Johnny Paul Koroma – Major of the Sierra-Leone Army
 Gabriel Kpamber – ECOMOG Commander-in-chief
 John Weston – UK Ambassador to the UN
 Kofi Annan – Secretary-General of the UN
 Bill Richardson – US Ambassador to the UN
 Philippe Maughan – European Community

References

External links
 
 The Empire in Africa on Vimeo

2006 films
French documentary films
Documentaries about war
French war films